Mona O. Knox (May 1, 1929 – June 11, 2008) was an American model and film actress.

Personal life
On August 6, 1960, Knox married obstetrician Leslie Spicer in Encino. They had a son and were divorced on December 14, 1961.

Partial filmography
 A Woman of Distinction (1950) - Minor Role (uncredited)
 Tarzan and the Slave Girl (1950) - Slave Girl (uncredited)
 The Petty Girl (1950) - Mazola Petty Girl (uncredited)
 Flying Leathernecks (1951) - Annabelle (uncredited)
 Sunny Side of the Street (1951) - Bathing Girl (uncredited)
 Reunion in Reno (1951) - Ruthie (uncredited)
 Two Tickets to Broadway (1951) - Showgirl (uncredited)
 Footlight Varieties (1951) - Brunette on beach (uncredited)
 The Greatest Show on Earth (1952) - Mona (uncredited)
 The Las Vegas Story (1952) - Change Girl (uncredited)
 Aladdin and His Lamp (1952) - Dancing Girl (uncredited)
 Hold That Line (1952) - Katie Wayne
 Kid Monk Baroni (1952) - June Travers
 Thundering Caravans (1952) - Alice Scott
 Army Bound (1952) - Gladys
 Eight Iron Men (1952) - Girl in Daydream (uncredited)
 Jalopy (1953) - Slip's dancing partner
 All Ashore (1953) - Bit Role (uncredited)
 The Girl Next Door (1953) - Smitty (uncredited)
 Escape from Terror (1955) - Kathe Solotkin
 Hold Back Tomorrow (1955) - Escort Girl
 Rosemary's Baby (1968) - Mrs. Byron (uncredited) (final film role)

References

Bibliography
 Bernard A. Drew. Motion Picture Series and Sequels: A Reference Guide. Routledge, 2013.

External links

1929 births
2009 deaths
American film actresses
20th-century American actresses
Female models from Oklahoma
21st-century American women